Vijalpore is a city and Municipality in the Navsari district in the Indian state of Gujarat.  The town is located 5 km south-west of Navsari near Surat-Nasik Highway. The town comes under the purview of Surat Metropolitan Region.

Geography 
The city is located at an average elevation of 12 metres (66 feet).

Demographics
As of the 2001 Census of India, Vejalpore had a population of 56567. Males constitute 50% of the population and females 40%. Vejalpore has an average literacy rate of 74%, higher than the national average of 59.5%: male literacy is 81%, and female literacy is 63%. In Vejalpore, 14% of the population is under 6 years of age.

References

Cities and towns in Navsari district